Mustapha Bennacer (born 27 July 1977) is an Algerian long-distance runner. He competed in the men's marathon at the 2004 Summer Olympics.

References

External links
 

1977 births
Living people
Athletes (track and field) at the 2004 Summer Olympics
Algerian male long-distance runners
Algerian male marathon runners
Olympic athletes of Algeria
Place of birth missing (living people)
21st-century Algerian people
20th-century Algerian people